Ralph Berzsenyi (26 February 1909 – 10 June 1978) was a Hungarian sport shooter who competed in the 1936 Summer Olympics.

He was born in Fiume and died in Budapest.

In 1936 he won the silver medal in the 50 metre rifle, prone event.

References

1909 births
1978 deaths
Hungarian male sport shooters
ISSF rifle shooters
Olympic shooters of Hungary
Shooters at the 1936 Summer Olympics
Olympic silver medalists for Hungary
Medalists at the 1936 Summer Olympics
Olympic medalists in shooting